Garga-samhita (IAST: Garga-saṃhitā), is an Indian Sanskrit-language text on jyotisha (ancient Indian astrology and astronomy), written as a dialogue between the sages Bharadvaja and Garga. Although attributed to Garga, it was definitely not composed by the ancient astrologer of that name, and can be dated to 6th-7th century CE.

Date and manuscripts 

The text is of uncertain date, but was definitely composed after Brahmagupta's Brahma-sphuta-siddhanta (6th-7th century CE). Based on its mathematical contents, Michio Yano dates Garga-samhita to 6th-7th century CE.

The text is known from a manuscript kept at the Vishveshvaranand Vedic Research Institute (VVRI), Hoshiarpur. The VVRI manuscript 2069 was copied by Thakura Datta Joshi and collated by Hariprasada Sharma at Hoshiarpur in 1960.

Content 

The text is also known as the "astronomical Garga-samhita" to distinguish it from the "astrological" Gargiya-jyotisha, an earlier text which is also known as Garga-samhita.

Written in the style of the Puranas, the text features a dialogue between the sages Bharadvaja and Garga. It contains 20 chapters: the first four chapters feature Puranic cosmology, and the subsequent chapters discuss mathematical astronomy. The 20 chapters and their topics include:

 Kālasva-rūpa-vidhāna: time
 Puruṣa-kṛtyā-disṛṣṭ-ividhā
 Sakala-jagad-graha-sṛṣṭi-vidhāna: dimensions of the seven worlds (including Jambu), the seven oceans, and the seven underworlds
 Mṛtyu-graha-cakra-vidhāna: mythological accounts of planets
 Graha-kaṣyādibhagaṇotpatti-vidhāna: decimal places, circumference of planetary orbits (Moon, Mercury, Venus, Sun, Mars, Jupiter, and Saturn)
 Graha-madhya-vidhāna: computation of accumulated days since the epoch of the current kalpa
 Jīvā-janma: derivation of 36 sines
 Jīvā-vidhā: values of sines and versine
 Graha-sphuṭī-karma: changes in the size of epicycles according to the quadrant
 Jīvā-prakalpana: a table of 12 sine values with radius=3438, almost same as the one given by Aryabhatta
 Laghu-sphuṭa-vihāna: manda (slow) and śīghra (fast) equations
 Untitled
 Untitled, explanation of irregular motions of planets using the fast apogee and the slow apogee; description of synodic arcs of five planets
 Untitled: longitudes of the chief star in the nakshatra
 Untitled
 Untitled: Maximum latitudes in minutes for various planets
 Chāyā-vidhāna: several topics usually dealt with a chapter titled Tri-praśnā-dhyāya in other astronomical texts. For example, raidus of the great circle, longitude of the sun, equinoctial noon hypotenuse etc.
 Untitled, the conjunction of planets
 Sūrya-grahaṇa: solar eclipses, longitudinal and latitudinal parallaxes
 Chedaka: graphical representation of the three-dimensional objects on to a plane surface; briefly discusses lunar eclipses

References

Bibliography 

 
 

Sanskrit texts
Indian astronomy texts
6th-century works